The terms average Joe, ordinary Joe, Joe Sixpack, Joe Lunchbucket, Joe Snuffy, Joe Blow, Joe Schmoe (for males) and ordinary Jane, average Jane, and plain Jane (for females), are used primarily in North America to refer to a completely average person, typically an average American. It can be used both to give the image of a hypothetical "completely average person" or to describe an existing person. Parallel terms in other languages for local equivalents exist worldwide.

Today, statistics by the United States Department of Commerce provide information regarding the societal attributes of those who may be referred to as being "average". While some individual attributes are easily identified as being average, such as the median income, other characteristics, such as family arrangements may not be identified as being average.

In 2001, for example, no single household arrangement constituted more than 30% of total households. Married couples with no children were the most common constituting 28.7% of households. It would nonetheless be inaccurate to state that the average American lives in a childless couple arrangement as 71.3% do not. Other "average" characteristics are easier to identify.

In terms of social class, the average American may be described as either being middle  or working class. As social classes lack distinct boundaries the average American may have a status in the area where the lower middle and upper working class overlap. Overall the average Americans, age 25 or older, made roughly $32,000 per year; do not have a college degree; have been, are, or will be married as well as divorced at least once during their lifetime; live in their own home in a suburban setting, and hold a white-collar office job.

"Average Joes" are common fodder for characters in television or movies, comics, novels or radio dramas. On television, examples of "average Joes" include Doug Heffernan (King of Queens), Alan Harper (Two and a Half Men) and Homer Simpson (The Simpsons). In the film Dodgeball: A True Underdog Story, the protagonist, Peter, owns a gym for those who do not want an intensive workout, and the patrons of the gym are all somewhat overweight. The gym is named Average Joe's Gymnasium.

In real life, as chronicled in his bestseller The Average American: The Extraordinary Search for the Nation's Most Ordinary Citizen, Kevin O'Keefe successfully completed a nationwide search for the person who was the most statistically average in the United States during a multi-year span starting in 2000. Newsweek proclaimed of the book, "The journey toward run-of-the-mill has never been so remarkable."

Families

As the United States is a highly diverse nation, it should not be surprising that there is no single prevalent household arrangement. While the "nuclear family" consisting of a married couple with their own children is often seen as the average American family, such households constitute less than a quarter of all households. Married couples without children are currently the plurality constituting 28.7% of households, compared to 24.1% for nuclear families.

Another 25.5% of households consisted of single persons residing alone. Recent trends have shown the numbers of nuclear families as well as childless married couples decrease. In 1970, 40.3% of US households consisted of nuclear families with childless couples making up 30.3% of households and 10.6% of households being arranged in "Other family types."

By 2000 the percentage of nuclear families had decreased by 40%, while the number of other family types had increased by 51%. The percentage of single households has also steadily increased. In 1970, only 17% of households consisted of singles. In 2000 that figure had increased by 50% with singles constituting 25.5% of households. The most drastic increase was among the percentage of households made up of single males, which nearly doubled from 5.6% in 1970 to 10.7% in 2000.

Today, one can no longer refer to the nuclear family as the average American household, neither can one identify the current plurality of married couples without children as "the average." Recent statistics indeed indicate that there is no average American family arrangement, but that American society is home to a wide and diverse variety of family arrangements. The one thing the data does indicate is that the average Joe most likely does not reside in a nuclear 4-person family.

A statement that can be made, however, is that most Americans will marry at least once in their lifetime with the first marriage most commonly ending in divorce. Today a little over half (52.3%) of US household include a married couple, showing a significant decrease since 1970 when 70.6% of households included a married couple. Current trends indicate that people in the US are marrying later and less often with higher divorce rates.

Despite the declining prevalence of marriage, more than three-quarters of Americans will marry at least once in their lifetime. The average age for marriage for a male was 26.8 and 25.1 for a female. Americans are also likely to remarry after their first divorce. In 1990, 40% of all marriages were remarriages. All together one can conclude that while there is no prevalent average household arrangement, most Americans (the average Joe) will get married and divorced once with a considerable number of Americans remarrying at least once.

Income

Income in the United States is most commonly measured either by individual or household. In 2005 the median personal income, the amount earned by the average Joe or average Jane, is largely determined by who is or who is not included in the statistics. Personal income statistics are given in accordance to a variety of demographic characteristics. The median income for all 233 million persons over the age of 15 was $28,567.

By only including those above age 25, the vast majority of students and all working adolescents are excluded. The median income for the people above the age 25 was $32,140 in 2005. Of those with incomes, over the age of 25, almost three quarters, 73.31%, the median income was clocked at $39,336 in 2005.  This figure excludes those employed part-time, students, working teenagers, retirees and the unemployed. Depending on whether or not those working part-time are included, the average American makes between $32,000 and $39,000.

In 2005, 42% of all households and 76% of households in the top quintile had two or more income earners. As a result, there was a considerable discrepancy between household and personal income. Recent studies, such as the one conducted by Harvard professor Elizabeth Warren, have shown that the average American household needs two incomes in order to live what is commonly perceived as a middle-class lifestyle.

The median income per household member was clocked at $24,672 in 2005. This means that the average Joe earns roughly $32,000 a year, lives in a household with an income of $46,000 with $24,000 of gross annual income per member. Personal income changes considerably over the life-time of the average American, from $28,000 at age 25 to about $42,000 at the age of 65. Yet, very young and old persons would commonly not be considered to be average Americans.

SOURCE: US Census Bureau, 2006

Income at a glance

Education

The US population seems almost equally divided between those who have and those who have not attended college. While only a minority of Americans, 27.6%, have graduated from college with a Bachelor's degree or more, a slight majority, 53%, of Americans had "some college" education. As only 36.2% had an Associates degree or more, with only roughly 9% having a graduate degree. On the other end of the strata, 14.8% of persons did not graduate from high school.

It is fair to assume that the average Joe/Jane is neither a college graduate nor a high school drop-out. It is, however, difficult to determine whether or not the average American has some college education as the population is split between those who did and did not attend college. Over the past half century the educational attainment of the US population has significantly increased.

The income of an individual with some college education was also similar to the overall mean personal income. The mean personal income for someone with some college education was $31,054, compared to $32,140 for the overall population, age 25 or older with earnings. The mean income for a high school graduate, on the other hand, was considerably below the national mean personal income estimated at $26,505.

Overall, despite a slight decrease in the percentage of high school graduates and significantly slower growth of college graduate, the average American is more educated today than ever before, having graduated from high school and likely, though not necessarily, attended college.

SOURCE: US Census Bureau, 2005

Social class

In terms of social class the average American may be referred to as being either a member of the middle or working class. The discrepancy is largely the result of differing class models and definitions of what constitutes a member of the middle class. Currently the vast majority of Americans self-identify as middle class, yet some experts in the field such as Michael Zweig of Stony Brook University or Dennis Gilbert of Cornell University have brought forth different theories. As most Americans are neither professionals nor managers and lack college degrees the average American may be described as being either or both, lower middle and working class.

Occupational autonomy is a key factor in regards to class positions. Professionals and managers who are exclusively labeled as middle class and often as upper middle class, conceptualize, create and consult in their jobs. Due to their great expertise they enjoy a high degree of autonomy in the work place.

The American economy, however, does not require a labor force consisting solely of professionals. Instead it requires a greatly diverse and specialized labor force. Thus the majority of Americans complete assigned tasks with considerably less autonomy and creative freedom than professionals, leading to theory that they may better be described as being members of the working class.

Occupation

Most Americans today are white collar salaried employees who work in varied environments, including offices, retail outlets, and hospitals. Roughly one quarter (23.4%) of Americans were employed in the traditional blue collar fields that require hard physical labor with another 14% employed in the service industry. Office administrators or more colloquial, secretaries, were the largest single occupation in the United States. In 2004 there were 4.1 million secretaries with a median income of $34,970, near the national median of $32,000.

Overall those employed in office administrative and support, service and sales occupations constituted 38.6% of the labor force. Those employed in business and professional as well as professional support occupations (e.g. nurses) made up 38.0% of the labor force. Combined white collar employees including service workers such as restaurant serves and hotel maids constituted 76.6% of the labor force. If service workers are excluded 62.8% were employed in white collar occupations.

Educational attainment varied greatly depending on occupational field with 68% of those in the professional and professional support fields having a bachelor's degree or higher, compared to only 31.6% of those employed in sales and 11.6% of those in the service sector. The average American does not have a bachelor's degree and is most likely employed in the service, sales, and office support fields with many working in the professional support and business fields as well. All together the American economy and labor force have changed greatly since the middle of the 20th. century with most workers today being employed in office and service occupations.

Homeownership

According to US Department of Commerce data the vast majority, 67% of housing units in the United States were owner occupied, had three or fewer bedrooms with one or less occupant per room (including kitchen, dining room, living room, etc. ...) and were mortgaged. The overwhelming majority, 85%, of all housing units had three or fewer bedrooms while 15% of all housing had 4 or more bedrooms. The plurality of housing units, 40%, had three bedrooms. The vast majority, 67%, of housing units were mortgaged with 52% households spending 25% or less of their annual income on mortgage payments.

The median value of a housing unit in the US was $167,500 in 2005 with the median mortgage payment being clocked at $1,295. The average size of a household was 2.5 persons with almost all housing units, 97%, having 1 or fewer occupants per room. However, the term "room" does not exclusively refer to bedrooms, but includes the kitchen, dining room, family room, bath rooms and any other rooms a house might have. While 85% of American homes had 3 or fewer bedrooms the median number of total rooms per housing units was 5.3 in 2005. Considering these statistics one can conclude that the average Americans reside in their own home, pay roughly $1,000 per month in mortgage payments for a three or less bedroom house with no more than one occupant per room.

US Census Bureau data from 2002 identified a series of housing characteristics for units owner-occupied units inhabited by households with average incomes, ranging from $40,000 to $60,000. The median square footage for homes occupied by middle income households was 1,700 with 52% of such homes having two or more bathrooms. The median value of these homes was $112,000 with the median year of construction being 1970. Middle income households tended to spend roughly 18% of their monthly income on housing. Considering these statistics it is likely that many average Americans reside in  homes, priced slightly above $100,000 with two or more bathrooms that were built in the late 1960s and early 1970s. However, the taken income is slightly above average.

See also
Commoner
Culture of the United States
Demographics of the United States
Joe Bloggs
John Doe
John Q. Public
Homeownership in the United States
Keeping up with the Joneses
List of terms related to an average person
Social structure of the United States

International
The man on the Clapham Omnibus

References

American English idioms
Anonymity pseudonyms
Demographics of the United States
Income in the United States
Placeholder names
Social concepts
Society of the United States